Paphiopedilum ciliolare is a species of flowering plant in the orchid family, Orchidaceae. It is known commonly as the short haired paphiopedilum. It is endemic to the Philippines.

This is a rare orchid with a total wild population of fewer than 2500 mature individuals. It is heavily collected for the horticulture trade and its forest habitat is threatened with destruction and degradation.

This species is notoriously difficult to propagate. Germination media are most effective when they contain sugar and tryptone.

References 

ciliolare
Endangered plants
Endemic orchids of the Philippines
Taxonomy articles created by Polbot